Baseball law refers to the various civil statutes, local ordinances, and court decisions pertaining to the game of baseball and its institutions, as distinguished from the Rules of Baseball, which are a private codification of rules governing the internal workings of baseball games.

Nineteenth-century baseball law

Both the early rules (which act as the laws of the game) and the legal cases surrounding the sport impact the way baseball is played to this day. Documentation of early baseball law exists but has been rarely studied. Nonetheless its presence in legal disputes and records indicate that it was an important part of American life before 1900. In fact, references to baseball are present in 168 legal cases decided before the turn of the twentieth century.

"Blue" laws

In America's past, "blue" laws prohibited business from taking place on the Sabbath. This was an issue for baseball teams who were playing for spectators on Sundays. On April 30, 1891, Tim O'Rourk and 19 others were the subject of a criminal complaint that pertained to them playing baseball for an audience of about 3,000 in Lincoln Park the previous Sunday. The case of State v. O'Rourk ensued.

It was illegal at the time for anyone over age 14 "engage in sporting" on a Sunday. The penalty for which was "a fine of $20, incarceration for 20 days, or both." The accused argued that baseball did not fall under the category of "sport" and that they were remotely located enough so as not to have offended those observing the Sabbath. The presiding judge dismissed the case on those grounds. However, Chief Justice Maxwell of the Nebraska Supreme Court disagreed.

This case showed that there was a growing class of people willing to depart from tradition and attend a baseball game on a Sunday. It also indicates that there were those who adamantly resisted such change.

Star players

"Free agency" did not exist as it does today in baseball until the 1970s. Instead, players were bound to their teams by something called the "reserve clause". John "Monte" Ward was the first to oppose this in November 1889. He was a star player for the National League's New York Giants, but was also an author and lawyer.

The "reserve" clause did not specify terms of contract, salary or agreements between player and teams. A judge ultimately ruled that with such fundamental questions left unanswered, the clause could not reasonably be enforced.

This was the first case of many that ruled in favor of the individual player rather than the team. It allowed star players more choices and the ability to use competition to increase their value.

Baseball Rule

In 1913 a Missouri appeals court heard Crane v. Kansas City Baseball & Exhibition Co., a tort case where a spectator at a Kansas City Blues game who had been struck and injured by a foul ball alleged the team had been negligent. But since he had chosen to sit in an unprotected area of the park, even though tickets were general admission and seats were available behind the backstop, the court held for the team per the contributory negligence and assumption of risk doctrines.

This holding was adopted by courts hearing similar cases in other states, and by the 1920s it had understood that as long as teams made enough protected seats available to meet reasonably anticipated demand, they had met their duty of reasonable care to spectators and could not be held liable for most foul ball injuries to them. Now known as the Baseball Rule, this holding remains good law in many states today, even after comparative negligence became the primary doctrine of tort law in most states. In the 21st century, it has come under increasing criticism as outdated both legally and in relation to baseball.

"Jim Crow" ball

Hispanic, black and white Americans have all played baseball since the sport began. In the early days of the sport, integrated teams were not uncommon, with players of color able to play alongside their white counterparts.

However, dating back to as early as 1867, the racism of the post-Civil War era crept into the national pastime. Jim Crow laws were present from Reconstruction into the 1960s and in some instances applied directly to baseball, relegating black players to the Negro leagues while whites played in Major League Baseball. However, segregation in MLB began to end with the signing and debut of Jackie Robinson with the Brooklyn Dodgers in 1947.

Lawlessness

It cannot be denied that early baseball law was lax compared to the standards of today. As with so many other examples, the development of baseball law mirrors the arc of America's history at large. Despite the many cases and legal examples, historians Robert M. Jarvis and Phyllis Coleman have suggested that "early baseball was a lawless place, just like America itself."

Baseball and the legal profession

Innumerable American lawyers and judges have played baseball – amateur or professional – since the game coalesced in the 19th century.  Perhaps the iconic legal publication regarding baseball is the article "The Common Law Origins of the Infield Fly Rule", written by Philadelphia attorney William S. Stevens and published in the University of Pennsylvania Law Review in 1975.

Five of the ten Commissioners of Baseball have been lawyers: 

Several major league managers are known to have attended law school: 

Some other MLB players who practiced law after their playing careers:

References

Bibliography

Cases

 American League v. Chase, 86 Misc. 441 (N.Y. Misc. 1914)
 City of Anaheim v. Angels Baseball LP (2005)
 Federal Baseball Club v. National League, 
 Flood v. Kuhn, 
 Gardella v. Chandler, 174 F.2d 919 (2d Cir. 1949)
 Metropolitan Exhibition Co. v. Ward, 9 N.Y.S. 779 (1890)
 Philadelphia Ball Club, Ltd. v. Lajoie, 202 Pa. 210 (1902)
 Popov v. Hayashi (2002) (California Superior Court)
 Toolson v. New York Yankees, 
 United States v. Cleveland Indians Baseball Company,

Further reading

 
 
 Davies, Ross E., It's No Game: The Practice and Process of the Law in Baseball, and Vice Versa (November 20, 2009). Seton Hall Journal of Sports and Entertainment Law, Vol. 20, No. 2, pp. 249–296, 2010; George Mason Law & Economics Research Paper No. 09-58. Available at SSRN: .
 Ham, Eldon L., Aside the Aside: The True Precedent of Baseball in Law: Law the Residue of Luck -- Or, Who's Not on First? Marquette Sports Law Review, Vol. 13, p. 213, 2003.  Available at: .
 Jarvis, R.M. and Coleman, P. Early Baseball Law, American Journal of Legal History, Vol. 45, p. 117, 2001.
 
 Oldfather, Chad M., The Hidden Ball: A Substantive Critique of Baseball Metaphors in Judicial Opinions, Connecticut Law Review, Vol. 27, p. 17, 1994.
 
 Silvia, Thomas V., Baseball as a Source of Judicial Thought and Construction, Michigan Bar Journal, Vol. 78, p. 1296, 1999.
 
 Yelnosky, Michael, If You Write It, (S)He Will Come: Judicial Opinions, Metaphors, Baseball, and "The Sex Stuff", Connecticut Law Review, Vol. 28, p. 815, 1996.
 Zelinsky, Aaron S.J., The Supreme Court (of Baseball), Yale Law Journal Online, Vol 121, p. 143, 2011.
 Zollmann, Carl, Baseball Peonage, Marquette Law Review, Vol. 24, p. 139, 1940.  Available at: .

External links
 Baseball and the Law: University of Chicago Law Library
 Baseball Law Reporter (blog)

 
Sports law